Edward 'Eddie' Forrest (born 17 December 1978 in Edinburgh) is a Scottish footballer who is currently without a club.

Career
Forrest began his career with Stirling Albion, spending three years with The Binos before moving to Airdrieonians in 1999. In June 2000, Forrest was one of just three players to survive the club's financial troubles, with the majority of players released from their contracts. Subsequently, made redundant the following year, Forrest joined Scottish Premier League side Motherwell, only to suffer the same fate in April 2002. Forrest joined Berwick Rangers and had spells with Arbroath, a brief return to the SPL with Partick Thistle, Forfar Athletic and Ayr United before joining East Stirlingshire.  He retired from the game after two years with The Shire, but came out of retirement on November 2010 to return to Airdrie, to play for Airdrieonians' successors Airdrie United.

Hoax victim
In July 2003, Paul Browne returned to Arbroath, after Forrest left on the promise of full-time football at Raith Rovers. Arbroath manager John Brownlie signed Browne as a replacement for Forrest, then discovered that Forrest had been duped. A telephone call that Forrest had believed to be from Danny Smith, the Raith chairman, had been a hoax. The caller had been Browne, Forrest's prospective replacement, although Browne argued it was "a friend". Forrest was reinstated at Arbroath and Browne summarily sacked, fleeing Scotland, although Forrest subsequently join Partick Thistle, which led Brownlie to re-sign Browne to fill the defensive gap. Brownlie had to check with captain Andy Dow that the players would accept Browne after the hoax.

Honours
Airdrieonians
Scottish Challenge Cup: 2000–01

References

External links

1978 births
Living people
Scottish footballers
Stirling Albion F.C. players
Airdrieonians F.C. (1878) players
Motherwell F.C. players
Berwick Rangers F.C. players
Arbroath F.C. players
Partick Thistle F.C. players
Forfar Athletic F.C. players
Ayr United F.C. players
East Stirlingshire F.C. players
Scottish Premier League players
Scottish Football League players
Footballers from Edinburgh
Association football defenders
Airdrieonians F.C. players